Yonathan Betkolia is an Assyrian politician and a member of the Iranian Parliament. An Assyrian from Urmia, he has been a member of the Iranian Parliament for 5 terms. He is the secretary general of the Assyrian Universal Alliance.

Yonathan has been a member of the Board of Directors of the Assyrian Church of the East of Iran and was a founding member of the movement of the Assyrian Universal Alliance. From 1981 to 2007, he served as the Asia Regional Secretary, and in July 2007, he was elected unanimously as the Deputy Secretary General of the Assyrian Universal Alliance while keeping his previous position. Yonathan Betkolia was elected Secretary General of the Assyrian Universal Alliance in Jönköping, Sweden in the 25th Congress of AUA. After forty years, the presidency of this alliance was brought back to its original home, the Middle East.

References

Iranian Christians
Living people
Assyrian nationalists
Religious Minorities Representatives in Islamic Consultative Assembly
1951 births
Iranian Assyrian politicians
People from Urmia